The Belgian Athletics Championships is an annual outdoor track and field competition organised by the Royal Belgian Athletics League, which serves as the national championship for the sport in Belgium. It was first held in 1889 and introduced events for women in 1921. The competition was not held in the years from 1915 to 1918 due to World War I and also did not take place in 1940 and 1944 due to World War II. While most of the winners have been Belgian nationals, a small number of invited foreign athletes have won at the event.

Men

100 metres
1960: Paul Robijns
1961: Frank Roos
1962: Édouard Leroy
1963: Paul Poels
1964: Paul Poels
1965: Ignace Van der Cam
1966: Paul Poels
1967: Paul Poels
1968: Bernard Rossignol
1969: Paul Poels
1970: Paul Poels
1971: Jean-Pierre Borlée
1972: Mario Demarchi
1973: Guy Stas
1974: Lambert Micha
1975: Fons Brydenbach
1976: Frank Verhelst
1977: Lambert Micha
1978: Ronald Desruelles
1979: Ronald Desruelles
1980: Frank Verhelst
1981: Jacques Borlée
1982: Ronald Desruelles
1983: Jacques Borlée
1984: Ronald Desruelles
1985: Ronald Desruelles
1986: Ronald Desruelles
1987: Ronald Desruelles
1988: Patrick Stevens
1989: Patrick Stevens
1990: Patrick Stevens
1991: Patrick Stevens
1992: Patrick Stevens
1993: Patrick Stevens
1994: Patrick Stevens
1995: Patrick Stevens
1996: Erik Wijmeersch
1997: Patrick Stevens
1998: Erik Wijmeersch
1999: Patrick Stevens
2000: Patrick Stevens
2001: Bongelemba Bongelo
2002: Erik Wijmeersch
2003: Xavier De Baerdemaker
2004: Patrick Stevens
2005: Anthony Ferro
2006: Anthony Ferro

200 metres
1960: Jean-Pierre Barra
1961: Romain Poté
1962: Adhémar Schoufs
1963: Jacques Pennewaert
1964: Paul Poels
1965: Paul Poels
1966: Paul Poels
1967: Paul Poels
1968: Guy Stas
1969: Paul Poels
1970: Paul Poels
1971: Jean-Pierre Borlée
1972: Freddy Lucq
1973: Guy Stas
1974: Fons Brydenbach
1975: Fons Brydenbach
1976: Reno Roelandt
1977: Lambert Micha
1978: Reno Roelandt
1979: Jacques Borlée
1980: Frank Verhelst
1981: Jacques Borlée
1982: Kris Poté
1983: Jacques Borlée
1984: Jacques Borlée
1985: Ronald Desruelles
1986: Jeroen Fischer
1987: Jeroen Fischer
1988: Patrick Stevens
1989: Patrick Stevens
1990: Patrick Stevens
1991: Jeroen Fischer
1992: Patrick Stevens
1993: Patrick Stevens
1994: Patrick Stevens
1995: Erik Wijmeersch
1996: Patrick Stevens
1997: Erik Wijmeersch
1998: Erik Wijmeersch
1999: Erik Wijmeersch
2000: Patrick Stevens
2001: Erik Wijmeersch
2002: Cédric Van Branteghem
2003: Cédric Van Branteghem
2004: Anthony Ferro
2005: Kristof Beyens
2006: Cédric Van Branteghem

400 metres
1960: Louis De Clerck
1961: Louis De Clerck
1962: Louis De Clerck
1963: Jacques Pennewaert
1964: Jacques Pennewaert
1965: Willy Vandenwyngaerden
1966: Willy Vandenwyngaerden
1967: Willy Vandenwyngaerden
1968: Jacques Pennewaert
1969: Willy Vandenwyngaerden
1970: Gabriel De Geyter
1971: Willy Vandenwyngaerden
1972: Gabriel De Geyter
1973: Fons Brydenbach
1974: Mario De Marchi
1975: Christian Allemeersch
1976: Fons Brydenbach
1977: Fons Brydenbach
1978: Fons Brydenbach
1979: Fons Brydenbach
1980: Eddy De Leeuw
1981: Fons Brydenbach
1982: Jacques Borlée
1983: Eddy De Leeuw
1984: Dany Roelandt
1985: René Hermans
1986: Peter Pieters
1987: Roland Moens
1988: Jeroen Fischer
1989: Jeroen Fischer
1990: Jeroen Fischer
1991: Bart Carlier
1992: Bart Carlier
1993: Marc Dollendorf
1994: Frédéric Masson
1995: Olivier Melchior
1996: Frédéric Masson
1997: Olivier Melchior
1998: Kjell Provost
1999: Kjell Provost
2000: Kjell Provost
2001: Cédric Van Branteghem
2002: Peter Haesaerts
2003: Christophe Lumen
2004: Xavier De Baerdemaker
2005: Cédric Van Branteghem
2006: Jonathan Borlée

800 metres
1960: Roger Moens
1961: Roger Moens
1962: Jos Lambrechts
1963: Willy Mertens
1964: Jacques Pennewaert
1965: Willy Mertens
1966: André De Hertoghe
1967: Willy Mertens
1968: Gilbert Van Manshoven
1969: Tony Govaerts
1970: Eric Reygaert
1971: René Bervoets
1972: Herman Mignon
1973: Johan Van Wezer
1974: Johan Van Wezer
1975: Ivo Van Damme
1976: Guy Tondeur
1977: Tony Govaerts
1978: Guy Tondeur
1979: Julien Michiels
1980: Rudi De Wyngaert
1981: Julien Michiels
1982: Julien Michiels
1983: Walter Desmet
1984: Marnix Mabbe
1985: Philippe Detallenaere
1986: Marc Cortsjens
1987: Luc Bernaert
1988: Marnix Mabbe
1989: Luc Bernaert
1990: Not held
1991: Luc Bernaert
1992: Luc Bernaert
1993: Nathan Kahan
1994: Patrick Grammens
1995: Patrick Grammens
1996: Nathan Kahan
1997: Ben Quintelier
1998: Nathan Kahan
1999: Tim Rogge
2000: Nathan Kahan
2001: Joeri Jansen
2002: Joeri Jansen
2003: Joeri Jansen
2004: Tom Omey
2005: Tom Vanchaze
2006: Thomas Matthys

1500 metres
1960: Daniel Allewaert
1961: Jos Lambrechts
1962: Jos Lambrechts
1963: Gaston Roelants
1964: Eugène Allonsius
1965: Eugène Allonsius
1966: Paul Roekaerts
1967: André De Hertoghe
1968: Rudi Simon
1969: André De Hertoghe
1970: André De Hertoghe
1971: André De Hertoghe
1972: Herman Mignon
1973: Herman Mignon
1974: Léon Schots
1975: Léon Schots
1976: Ivo Van Damme
1977: Marc Nevens
1978: Marc Nevens
1979: Marc Nevens
1980: Jean-Pierre Paumen
1981: Bob Verbeeck
1982: Bob Verbeeck
1983: Eddy Stevens
1984: Rudi De Wyngaert
1985: Vincent Rousseau
1986: Vincent Rousseau
1987: Eddy Stevens
1988: Vincent Rousseau
1989: Gino Van Geyte
1990: Marc Cortsjens
1991: Christophe Impens
1992: Kris Sabbe
1993: Christophe Impens
1994: Christophe Impens
1995: Christophe Impens
1996: Christophe Impens
1997: Christophe Impens
1998: Wouter Van Den Broeck
1999: Mohammed Mourhit
2000: Luc Bernaert
2001: Jurgen Vandewiele
2002: Jurgen Vandewiele
2003: Tim Clerbout
2004: Ridouane Es-Saadi
2005: Joeri Jansen
2006: Matthieu Vandiest

5000 metres
1960: Eugène Allonsius
1961: Eugène Allonsius
1962: Eugène Allonsius
1963: Eugène Allonsius
1964: Eugène Allonsius
1965: Eugène Allonsius
1966: Eugène Allonsius
1967: Johnny Dumon
1968: Johnny Dumon
1969: Gaston Roelants
1970: Emiel Puttemans
1971: Emiel Puttemans
1972: Emiel Puttemans
1973: Emiel Puttemans
1974: Léon Schots
1975: Léon Schots
1976: Willy Polleunis
1977: Paul Thijs
1978: Léon Schots
1979: Willy Polleunis
1980: Emiel Puttemans
1981: Emiel Puttemans
1982: Jef Gees
1983: Jean-Pierre N'Dayisenga
1984: Vincent Rousseau
1985: Eddy De Pauw
1986: Willy Goddaert
1987: Vincent Rousseau
1988: Jean-Pierre N'Dayisenga
1989: Vincent Rousseau
1990: Raymond Van Paemel
1991: Ivo Claes
1992: Gino Van Geyte
1993: Ruddy Walem
1994: Gino Van Geyte
1995: Ruddy Walem
1996: Gino Van Geyte
1997: Gino Van Geyte
1998: 
1999: Guy Fays
2000: Koen Allaert
2001: Tom Compernolle
2002: Tom Compernolle
2003: Christian Nemeth
2004: Tom Compernolle
2005: Stefen Van Den Broek
2006:

10,000 metres
1960: Hedwig Leenaert
1961: Aurèle Vandendriessche
1962: Rik Clerckx
1963: Rik Clerckx
1964: Rik Clerckx
1965: Gaston Roelants
1966: Gaston Roelants
1967: Robert Folie
1968: Eugène Allonsius
1969: Gaston Roelants
1970: Eric Gyselinck
1971: Willy Polleunis
1972: Gaston Roelants
1973: Karel Lismont
1974: Emiel Puttemans
1975: Marc Smet
1976: Marc Smet
1977: Frank Grillaert
1978: Léon Schots
1979: Léon Schots
1980: Alex Hagelsteens
1981: Roger Devogel
1982: Léon Schots
1983: Erik De Beck
1984: Alex Hagelsteens
1985: Alex Hagelsteens
1986: Alex Hagelsteens
1987: Eddy De Pauw
1988: Jean-Pierre Paumen
1989: Jean-Pierre N'Dayisenga
1990: Ben Debognies
1991: Jos Maes
1992: Raf Wijns
1993: William Van Dijck
1994: Ivo Claes
1995: Ruddy Walem
1996: Peter De Vocht
1997: Gino Van Geyte
1998: Gino Van Geyte
1999: Koen Van Rie
2000: Koen Allaert
2001: Stefen Van Den Broek
2002: Guy Fays
2003: Hans Janssens
2004: Tom Van Hooste
2005: Guy Fays
2006: Guy Fays

Half marathon
1992: Rony Ligneel
1993: Eddy Hellebuyck
1994: Raf Wijns
1995: Ivo Claes
1996: Herman De Coux
1997: Gino Van Geyte
1998: Gino Van Geyte
1999: Koen Allaert
2000: Christian Nemeth
2001: Koen Allaert
2002: Wim De Keyser
2003: Rik Ceulemans
2004: Rik Ceulemans
2005: Rik Ceulemans

Marathon
The marathon championship was held on a short course in 1960, 1964, and 1980, but national titles were still awarded.
1960: Aurèle Vandendriessche
1961: Aurèle Vandendriessche
1962: Aurèle Vandendriessche
1963: Aurèle Vandendriessche
1964: Aurèle Vandendriessche
1965: Maurice Peiren
1966: Rik Clerckx
1967: Maurice Peiren
1968: Willy Vernisson
1969: Maurice Peiren
1970: Karel Lismont
1971: Karel Lismont
1972: Walter Van Renterghem
1973: Marnix Stevens
1974: Karel Lismont
1975: Henri Schoofs
1976: Henri Schoofs
1977: Eric Gyselinck
1978: Marc Smet
1979: Marc Smet
1980: Herman Parmentier
1981: Marc De Blander
1982: Fred Vandervennet
1983: Fred Vandervennet
1984: Johan Geimaert
1985: Fred Vandervennet
1986: Dirk Vanderherten
1987: Dirk Vanderherten
1988: Dirk Vanderherten
1989: Willy Vanhuylenbroeck
1990: Rony Ligneel
1991: Peter Daenens
1992: Francis Meirens
1993: Vincent Rousseau
1994: Vincent Rousseau
1995: Marc Verrydt
1996: Peter De Vocht
1997: Gino Van Geyte
1998: Gino Van Geyte
1999: Guy Fays
2000: Peter De Vocht
2001: Chris Verbeeck
2002: Rik Ceulemans
2003: Rik Ceulemans
2004: Rik Ceulemans
2005: Eric Gerome

3000 metres steeplechase
1960: Gaston Roelants
1961: Gaston Roelants
1962: Gaston Roelants
1963: Gaston Roelants
1964: Gaston Roelants
1965: Gaston Roelants
1966: Gaston Roelants
1967: Gaston Roelants
1968: Eddy Van Butsele
1969: Eddy Van Butsele
1970: Paul Thijs
1971: Paul Thijs
1972: Paul Thijs
1973: Paul Thijs
1974: Paul Thijs
1975: Paul Thijs
1976: Paul Thijs
1977: Paul Thijs
1978: Paul Thijs
1979: Paul Thijs
1980: Johan Van Leirsberghe
1981: Paul Thijs
1982: Peter Daenens
1983: William Van Dijck
1984: Peter Daenens
1985: William Van Dijck
1986: William Van Dijck
1987: William Van Dijck
1988: William Van Dijck
1989: Jos Maes
1990: William Van Dijck
1991: William Van Dijck
1992: William Van Dijck
1993: 
1994: William Van Dijck
1995: Jos Maes
1996: Maarten Vergote
1997: Maarten Vergote
1998: 
1999: Maarten Vergote
2000: 
2001: Maarten Vergote
2002: Maarten Vergote
2003: Krijn Van Koolwyk
2004: Pieter Desmet
2005: Koen Wilssens
2006: Koen Wilssens

110 metres hurdles
1960: Georges Salmon
1961: Léo Marien
1962: Wilfried Geeroms
1963: Wilfried Geeroms
1964: Léo Marien
1965: Luc Legros
1966: Wilfried Geeroms
1967: Wilfried Geeroms
1968: Wilfried Geeroms
1969: Wilfried Geeroms
1970: Wilfried Geeroms
1971: Freddy Herbrand
1972: Freddy Herbrand
1973: Wilfried Geeroms
1974: Wilfried Geeroms
1975: Marc Heck
1976: Joseph Leseque
1977: André Friedenberg
1978: Yves Lahaye
1979: André Friedenberg
1980: André Friedenberg
1981: André Friedenberg
1982: André Friedenberg
1983: Dirk Vandenbosch
1984: Rok Folens
1985: Serge Liègeois
1986: Roland Marloye
1987: Serge Liègeois
1988: Hubert Grossard
1989: Hubert Grossard
1990: Wim Van de Ven
1991: Hubert Grossard
1992: Hubert Grossard
1993: Hubert Grossard
1994: Jonathan Nsenga
1995: Johan Lisabeth
1996: Sven Pieters
1997: Jonathan Nsenga
1998: Sven Pieters
1999: Jonathan Nsenga
2000: Hubert Grossard
2001: Jonathan Nsenga
2002: Jonathan Nsenga
2003: 
2004: Damien Broothaerts
2005: Jonathan Nsenga
2006: Jonathan Nsenga

200 metres hurdles
1963: Étienne D'Heye
1964: Léo Marien

400 metres hurdles
1960: Marcel Lambrechts
1961: Marcel Lambrechts
1962: Marcel Lambrechts
1963: Wilfried Geeroms
1964: Wilfried Geeroms
1965: François Van Cauwenberghe
1966: Théo Van Moer
1967: Wilfried Geeroms
1968: Karel Brems
1969: Karel Brems
1970: Théo Van Moer
1971: Wilfried Geeroms
1972: René Ravets
1973: Henri Lessire
1974: Willy Vandenwyngaerden
1975: Willy Vandenwyngaerden
1976: Jean-Luc Clinquart
1977: Jacques Borlée
1978: Patrick Himschoot
1979: Michel Zimmerman
1980: Michel Zimmerman
1981: Michel Zimmerman
1982: Michel Zimmerman
1983: Rik Tommelein
1984: Michel Zimmerman
1985: Rik Tommelein
1986: Rik Tommelein
1987: Michel Zimmerman
1988: Alain Cuypers
1989: Alain Cuypers
1990: Koen Verlinde
1991: Alain Cuypers
1992: Jean-Paul Bruwier
1993: Jean-Paul Bruwier
1994: Jean-Paul Bruwier
1995: Marc Dollendorf
1996: Jean-Paul Bruwier
1997: Jean-Paul Bruwier
1998: Jean-Paul Bruwier
1999: Jean-Paul Bruwier
2000: Jean-Paul Bruwier
2001: Stijn Verleyen
2002: Stijn Verleyen
2003: 
2004: Rachid Malki
2005: Piet Deveughele
2006: Pieter De Schepper

High jump
1960: Jean Van Slype
1961: Charles Timmermans
1962: Charles Timmermans
1963: Charles Timmermans
1964: Freddy Herbrand
1965: Freddy Herbrand
1966: Yves Theisen
1967: Freddy Herbrand
1968: Yves Theisen
1969: Paul Dumont
1970: Freddy Herbrand
1971: Bruno Brokken
1972: Paul De Preter
1973: Guy Moreau
1974: Guy Moreau
1975: Guy Moreau
1976: Guy Moreau
1977: Guy Moreau
1978: Guy Moreau
1979: Guy Moreau
1980: Guy Moreau
1981: Peter Soetewey
1982: William Nachtegael
1983: Eddy Annys
1984: Marc Borra
1985: Eddy Annys
1986: Patrick Steemans
1987: Marc Hallemeersch
1988: Dimitri Maenhout
1989: Gerolf De Backer
1990: Gerolf De Backer
1991: Dimitri Maenhout
1992: Dimitri Maenhout
1993: 
1994: Dominique Sandron
1995: Carl Van Roeyen
1996: Livio Baggio
1997: Carl Van Roeyen
1998: Carl Van Roeyen
1999: Patrick De Paepe
2000: Patrick De Paepe
2001: Stijn Stroobants
2002: Stijn Stroobants
2003: Benoît Braconnier
2004: Stijn Stroobants
2005: Stijn Stroobants
2006: Stijn Stroobants

Pole vault
1960: Raymond Van Dijck
1961: Raymond Van Dijck
1962: Paul Coppejans
1963: Paul Coppejans
1964: Paul Coppejans
1965: Paul Coppejans
1966: Paul Coppejans
1967: Paul Coppejans
1968: Paul Coppejans
1969: Roger Lespagnard
1970: Roger Lespagnard
1971: Emile Dewil
1972: Roger Lespagnard
1973: Robert Jacqmain
1974: Emile Dewil
1975: Emile Dewil
1976: Elie Van Vlierberghe
1977: Elie Van Vlierberghe
1978: Patrick Desruelles
1979: Patrick Desruelles
1980: Patrick Desruelles
1981: Patrick Desruelles
1982: Jean-Marc Jacques
1983: Patrick Desruelles
1984: Patrick Desruelles
1985: Chris Rotiers
1986: Kris De Ridder
1987: Dirk Ledegen
1988: Marc Maes
1989: Peter Moreels
1990: Domitien Mestré
1991: Alan De Naeyer
1992: Peter Moreels
1993: Alan De Naeyer
1994: Alan De Naeyer
1995: Domitien Mestré
1996: Rens Blom
1997: Peter Moreels
1998: Wesley Rombaut
1999: Thibaut Duval
2000: Thibaut Duval
2001: Kevin Rans
2002: Thibaut Duval
2003: Thibaut Duval
2004: Kevin Rans
2005: Kevin Rans
2006: Kevin Rans

Long jump
1960: Walter Herssens
1961: Georges Salmon
1962: Jean Debroux
1963: Georges Salmon
1964: Willy De Rijcke
1965: Yves Theisen
1966: Yves Theisen
1967: Yves Theisen
1968: Yves Theisen
1969: Philippe Houseaux
1970: Yves Theisen
1971: Freddy Herbrand
1972: Freddy Herbrand
1973: Yves Theisen
1974: Yves Theisen
1975: Ronald Desruelles
1976: Ronald Desruelles
1977: Ronald Desruelles
1978: Ronald Desruelles
1979: Ronald Desruelles
1980: Roland Marloye
1981: Ronald Desruelles
1982: Ronald Desruelles
1983: Ronald Desruelles
1984: Ronald Desruelles
1985: Eric Adère
1986: Ronald Desruelles
1987: Jeroen Fischer
1988: Eric Van de Vijver
1989: Laurent Broothaerts
1990: Laurent Broothaerts
1991: Rudi Van Lancker
1992: Rudi Van Lancker
1993: Tom Hofmans
1994: Erik Nys
1995: Erik Nys
1996: Hugues Branle
1997: Erik Nys
1998: 
1999: Erik Nys
2000: David Branle
2001: David Branle
2002: Jan Guns
2003: Jan Guns
2004: Gert Messiaen
2005: Gert Messiaen
2006: Michael Velter

Triple jump
1960: Walter Herssens
1961: Jacques Septon
1962: Guy Lukowski
1963: Freddy Herbrand
1964: Freddy Herbrand
1965: Freddy Herbrand
1966: Jacques Septon
1967: Albert Van Hoorn
1968: Albert Van Hoorn
1969: Albert Van Hoorn
1970: Leopold Van Hamme
1971: Leopold Van Hamme
1972: Albert Van Hoorn
1973: Albert Van Hoorn
1974: Albert Van Hoorn
1975: Luc Carlier
1976: Luc Carlier
1977: Luc Carlier
1978: Luc Carlier
1979: Luc Carlier
1980: Didier Falise
1981: Didier Falise
1982: Didier Falise
1983: Benoît Lambert
1984: Didier Falise
1985: Didier Falise
1986: Didier Falise
1987: Didier Falise
1988: Didier Falise
1989: Didier Falise
1990: Didier Falise
1991: Bert Tomme
1992: Bert Tomme
1993: Kedjeloba Mambo
1994: Djeke Mambo
1995: Kedjeloba Mambo
1996: Djeke Mambo
1997: Kedjeloba Mambo
1998: Kedjeloba Mambo
1999: Kedjeloba Mambo
2000: Djeke Mambo
2001: Djeke Mambo
2002: Michael Velter
2003: Michael Velter
2004: Michael Velter
2005: Gert Brijs
2006: Djeke Mambo

Shot put
1960: Édouard Szostak
1961: Édouard Szostak
1962: Édouard Szostak
1963: Édouard Szostak
1964: Roland Borrey
1965: Bertrand De Decker
1966: Roland Borrey
1967: Bertrand De Decker
1968: Bertrand De Decker
1969: François Hoste
1970: Bertrand De Decker
1971: Bertrand De Decker
1972: Georges Schroeder
1973: Georges Schroeder
1974: Georges Schroeder
1975: Georges Schroeder
1976: Georges Schroeder
1977: Robert Van Schoor
1978: Georges Schroeder
1979: Georges Schroeder
1980: Georges Schroeder
1981: Georges Schroeder
1982: Noël Legros
1983: Georges Schroeder
1984: Noël Legros
1985: Noël Legros
1986: Noël Legros
1987: Noël Legros
1988: Noël Legros
1989: Stephan Ulrich
1990: Noël Legros
1991: Stephan Ulrich
1992: Christoph Dupont
1993: 
1994: Kurt Boffel
1995: Peter Van Den Eyden
1996: Wim Blondeel
1997: Wim Blondeel
1998: Wim Blondeel
1999: Wim Blondeel
2000: Filip Eeckhout
2001: Wim Blondeel
2002: Filip Eeckhout
2003: Wim Blondeel
2004: Wim Blondeel
2005: Wim Blondeel
2006: Wim Blondeel

Discus throw
1960: Édouard Szostak
1961: Édouard Szostak
1962: Édouard Szostak
1963: Édouard Szostak
1964: Bertrand De Decker
1965: Édouard Szostak
1966: Marcel Hertogs
1967: Bertrand De Decker
1968: Bertrand De Decker
1969: Robert Van Schoor
1970: Georges Schroeder
1971: Georges Schroeder
1972: Georges Schroeder
1973: Georges Schroeder
1974: Georges Schroeder
1975: Robert Van Schoor
1976: Georges Schroeder
1977: Georges Schroeder
1978: Georges Schroeder
1979: Georges Schroeder
1980: Georges Schroeder
1981: Georges Schroeder
1982: Robert Van Schoor
1983: Georges Schroeder
1984: Robert Van Schoor
1985: Georges Schroeder
1986: Robert Van Schoor
1987: Georges Schroeder
1988: Jordy Beernaert
1989: Jordy Beernaert
1990: Jo Van Daele
1991: Herman Van Uytven
1992: Jordy Beernaert
1993: Jo Van Daele
1994: Jo Van Daele
1995: Jo Van Daele
1996: Jo Van Daele
1997: Jo Van Daele
1998: Jo Van Daele
1999: Jo Van Daele
2000: Jo Van Daele
2001: Kris Coene
2002: Jo Van Daele
2003: Jo Van Daele
2004: Jo Van Daele
2005: Jo Van Daele
2006: Milosz Tomanek

Hammer throw
1960: Henri Haest
1961: Henri Haest
1962: Henri Haest
1963: Henri Haest
1964: Henri Haest
1965: Marcel Hertogs
1966: Marcel Hertogs
1967: Marcel Hertogs
1968: Marcel Hertogs
1969: Marcel Hertogs
1970: Édouard Van der Bleeken
1971: Jacques Mortier
1972: Marcel Hertogs
1973: Édouard Van der Bleeken
1974: Édouard Van der Bleeken
1975: Édouard Van der Bleeken
1976: Jacques Mortier
1977: Jacques Mortier
1978: Jacques Mortier
1979: Jacques Mortier
1980: Hugo Ciroux
1981: Guy Pierre
1982: Marnix Verhegghe
1983: Marnix Verhegghe
1984: Marnix Verhegghe
1985: Marnix Verhegghe
1986: Marnix Verhegghe
1987: Marnix Verhegghe
1988: Marnix Verhegghe
1989: Marnix Verhegghe
1990: Marnix Verhegghe
1991: Marnix Verhegghe
1992: Marnix Verhegghe
1993: Alex Malachenko
1994: Alex Malachenko
1995: Alex Malachenko
1996: Alex Malachenko
1997: Alex Malachenko
1998: Alex Malachenko
1999: Alex Malachenko
2000: Walter De Wyngaert
2001: Jelle Degraeuwe
2002: Walter De Wyngaert
2003: Walter De Wyngaert
2004: Walter De Wyngaert
2005: Walter De Wyngaert
2006: Walter De Wyngaert

Javelin throw
1960: Guy Van Zeune
1961: Guy Van Zeune
1962: Guy Van Zeune
1963: Charles De Backere
1964: Guy Van Zeune
1965: Guy Van Zeune
1966: Jacques Claessen
1967: Lode Wijns
1968: Guy Van Zeune
1969: Lode Wijns
1970: Louis Fortamps
1971: Lode Wijns
1972: Lode Wijns
1973: Lode Wijns
1974: Lode Wijns
1975: Lode Wijns
1976: Lode Wijns
1977: Lode Wijns
1978: Anton Duchateau
1979: Lode Wijns
1980: Luc Carlier
1981: Anton Duchateau
1982: Paul Deroo
1983: Anton Duchateau
1984: Jean-Paul Schlatter
1985: Jean-Paul Schlatter
1986: Frank Stockmans
1987: Jean-Paul Schlatter
1988: Jean-Paul Schlatter
1989: Frank Stockmans
1990: Jerome Putzeys
1991: Jean-Paul Schlatter
1992: Frank Stockmans
1993: Jean-Paul Schlatter
1994: Marc Van Mensel
1995: Johan Kloeck
1996: Marc Van Mensel
1997: Johan Kloeck
1998: 
1999: Johan Kloeck
2000: Marc Van Mensel
2001: Marc Van Mensel
2002: Marc Van Mensel
2003: Marc Van Mensel
2004: Marc Van Mensel
2005: Marc Van Mensel
2006: Loïc Lemaître

Decathlon
1960: Léo Marien
1961: Georges Salmon
1962: Léo Marien
1963: Adhémar Schoufs
1964: Jozef Kloeck
1965: Daniel Borrey
1966: Roger Lespagnard
1967: Roger Lespagnard
1968: Freddy Herbrand
1969: Roger Lespagnard
1970: Freddy Herbrand
1971: Freddy Herbrand
1972: Régis Ghesquière
1973: Freddy Herbrand
1974: Régis Ghesquière
1975: Régis Ghesquière
1976: Roger Lespagnard
1977: Régis Ghesquière
1978: André Friedenberg
1979: André Friedenberg
1980: Piet Van Vaerenbergh
1981: Roland Marloye
1982: Piet Van Vaerenbergh
1983: Piet Van Vaerenbergh
1984: Roland Marloye
1985: Roland Marloye
1986: Roland Marloye
1987: Erwin Van Nieuwenhove
1988: Roland Marloye
1989: Erwin Van Nieuwenhove
1990: Vincent Verleye
1991: Vincent Verleye
1992: Bert Van Opstel
1993: Vincent Verleye
1994: Raf Coomans
1995: Serge De Smet
1996: Serge De Smet
1997: Wim Van Meerbeeck
1998: Raf Coomans
1999: Serge De Smet
2000: Steve De Baer
2001: Serge De Smet
2002: Frank Vandaele
2003: Frédéric Xhonneux
2004: François Gourmet
2005: Hans Van Alphen
2006: Loïc Lemaître

20 kilometres walk
The event was held on a track from 1987–89, 1994–6, 1999, and 2003.
1960: Joël Vanderhaeghen
1961: Robert Schoukens
1962: Joël Vanderhaeghen
1963: Robert Rinchard
1964: Robert Schoukens
1965: Robert Schoukens
1966: Maurice Van Liedekerke
1967: Maurice Van Liedekerke
1968: Robert Rinchard
1969: Robert Rinchard
1970: Maurice Van Liedekerke
1971: Léon Peeters
1972: Godfried Dejonckheere
1973: Godfried Dejonckheere
1974: Godfried Dejonckheere
1975: Godfried Dejonckheere
1976: Godfried Dejonckheere
1977: Godfried Dejonckheere
1978: Godfried Dejonckheere
1979: Marc Musiaux
1980: Marc Musiaux
1981: Gérard Goujon
1982: Donald Debel
1983: Donald Debel
1984: Eric Ledune
1985: Eric Ledune
1986: Jos Martens
1987: Jos Martens
1988: Godfried Dejonckheere
1989: Godfried Dejonckheere
1990: Godfried Dejonckheere
1991: Gérard Goujon
1992: Godfried Dejonckheere
1993: ?
1994: Benjamin Leroy
1995: Benjamin Leroy
1996: Benjamin Leroy
1997: Dirk Nicque
1998: Benjamin Leroy
1999: Benjamin Leroy
2000: Dirk Bogaert
2001: Benjamin Leroy
2002: Christophe Humé
2003: Christophe Humé
2004: Frank Buytaert
2005: Frank Buytaert
2006: Loïc Lemaître

50 kilometres walk
1960: Joël Vanderhaeghen
1961: Robert Schoukens
1962: Robert Schoukens
1963: Louis Schenk
1964: Robert Schoukens
1965: Gérard Cnockaert
1966: Robert Rinchard
1967: René Timmermans
1968: Robert Schoukens
1969: Robert Rinchard
1970: Pierre Bellanger
1971: Robert Rinchard
1972: Léon Peeters
1973: Godfried Dejonckheere
1974: Christian Halloy
1975: Godfried Dejonckheere
1976: Godfried Dejonckheere
1977: Gérard Goujon
1978: Christian Halloy
1979: Gérard Goujon
1980: Gérard Goujon
1981: Gérard Goujon
1982: Donald Debel
1983: Gérard Goujon
1984: Not held
1985: Godfried Dejonckheere
1986: Eric Ledune
1987: Godfried Dejonckheere
1988: Godfried Dejonckheere
1989: Godfried Dejonckheere
1990: Godfried Dejonckheere
1991: Godfried Dejonckheere
1992: Godfried Dejonckheere
1993: ?
1994: Luc Nicque
1995: Dirk Nicque
1996: Dirk Nicque
1997: Luc Nicque
1998: ?
1999: ?
2000: ?
2001: ?
2002: Christophe Humé
2003: Christophe Humé
2004: Frank Buytaert
2005: Dirk Nicque
2006: Loïc Lemaître

Cross country (long course)
1960: Hedwig Leenaert
1961: Gaston Roelants
1962: Gaston Roelants
1963: Gaston Roelants
1964: Gaston Roelants
1965: Rik Clerckx
1966: Gaston Roelants
1967: Gaston Roelants
1968: Gaston Roelants
1969: Gaston Roelants
1970: Gaston Roelants
1971: Willy Polleunis
1972: Gaston Roelants
1973: Willy Polleunis
1974: Erik De Beck
1975: Emiel Puttemans
1976: Erik De Beck
1977: Karel Lismont
1978: Willy Polleunis
1979: Léon Schots
1980: Karel Lismont
1981: Emiel Puttemans
1982: Léon Schots
1983: Léon Schots
1984: Vincent Rousseau
1985: Jef Gees
1986: Eddy De Pauw
1987: Vincent Rousseau
1988: Vincent Rousseau
1989: Jos Maes
1990: Vincent Rousseau
1991: Vincent Rousseau
1992: Vincent Rousseau
1993: Vincent Rousseau
1994: Vincent Rousseau
1995: Vincent Rousseau
1996: William Van Dijck
1997: Mohammed Mourhit
1998: Mohammed Mourhit
1999: Mohammed Mourhit
2000: Jerry Van Den Eede
2001: Tom Van Hooste
2002: Tom Van Hooste
2003: Tom Van Hooste
2004: Tom Compernolle
2005: Tom Van Hooste
2006: Pieter Desmet

Cross country (short course)
1992: Christophe Impens
1993: Bert Meganck
1994: Rudy Vlasselaer
1995: Rudy Vlasselaer
1996: Frédéric Desmedt
1997: François Carpentier
1998: Wouter Van Den Broeck
1999: Luc Bernaert
2000: Patrick Grammens
2001: Jurgen Vandewiele
2002: Ridouane Es-Saadi
2003: Ridouane Es-Saadi
2004: Ridouane Es-Saadi
2005: Mario Van Waeyenberge
2006: Mario Van Waeyenberge

Women

100 metres
1960: Hilde De Cort
1961: Therese Schueremans
1962: Doreete Van de Broeck
1963: Therese Schueremans
1964: Therese Schueremans
1965: Monique Vanherck
1966: Monique Vanherck
1967: Monique Vanherck
1968: Rozika Verberck
1969: Rita Jacobs
1970: Francine Van Assche
1971: Francine Van Assche
1972: Lea Alaerts
1973: Lea Alaerts
1974: Véronique Colonval
1975: Lea Alaerts
1976: Lea Alaerts
1977: Lea Alaerts
1978: Katrien Hoeree
1979: Lea Alaerts
1980: Lea Alaerts
1981: Liliane Meganck
1982: Liliane Meganck
1983: Karin Verguts
1984: Ingrid Verbruggen
1985: Ingrid Verbruggen
1986: Tonia Oliviers
1987: Ingrid Verbruggen
1988: Ingrid Verbruggen
1989: Ingrid Verbruggen
1990: Anne Carrette
1991: Katrien Maenhout
1992: Valérie Denis
1993: 
1994: Sandrine Hennart
1995: Sandrine Hennart
1996: Kim Gevaert
1997: Nancy Callaerts
1998: Kim Gevaert
1999: Kim Gevaert
2000: Kim Gevaert
2001: Kim Gevaert
2002: Kim Gevaert
2003: Kim Gevaert
2004: Kim Gevaert
2005: Kim Gevaert
2006: Kim Gevaert

200 metres
1960: Adelhaid Denorme
1961: Jannine Knaepen
1962: Therese Schueremans
1963: Therese Schueremans
1964: Louise Fricq
1965: Annie-Paule Knipping
1966: Louise Fricq
1967: Rozika Verberck
1968: Godelieve Ducatteeuw
1969: Godelieve Ducatteeuw
1970: Francine Van Assche
1971: Francine Van Assche
1972: Véronique Colonval
1973: Rosine Wallez
1974: Rosine Wallez
1975: Lea Alaerts
1976: Lea Alaerts
1977: Lea Alaerts
1978: Katrien Hoeree
1979: Lea Alaerts
1980: Lea Alaerts
1981: Edith De Maertelaere
1982: Liliane Meganck
1983: Karin Verguts
1984: Karin Verguts
1985: Ingrid Verbruggen
1986: Tonia Oliviers
1987: Ingrid Verbruggen
1988: Ingrid Verbruggen
1989: Ingrid Verbruggen
1990: Sylvia Dethier
1991: Sylvia Dethier
1992: Sylvia Dethier
1993: 
1994: Sylvia Dethier
1995: Kim Gevaert
1996: Kim Gevaert
1997: Kim Gevaert
1998: Kim Gevaert
1999: Kim Gevaert
2000: Katleen De Caluwé
2001: Kim Gevaert
2002: Audrey Rochtus
2003: Audrey Rochtus
2004: Kim Gevaert
2005: Kim Gevaert
2006: Kim Gevaert

400 metres
1960: Marie-Louise Wirix
1961: Marie-Louise Wirix
1962: Marie-Louise Wirix
1963: Godelieve Roggeman
1964: Godelieve Roggeman
1965: Annie-Paule Knipping
1966: Marie-Claire Clerbout
1967: Annie-Paule Knipping
1968: Danielle Leveque
1969: Francine Peyskens
1970: Annie-Paule Knipping
1971: Marina Bruynooghe
1972: Godelieve Ducatteeuw
1973: Lea Alaerts
1974: Rosine Wallez
1975: Rosine Wallez
1976: Regine Berg
1977: Rosine Wallez
1978: Rosine Wallez
1979: Anne Michel
1980: Rosine Wallez
1981: Rosine Wallez
1982: Rosine Wallez
1983: Regine Berg
1984: Regine Berg
1985: Regine Berg
1986: Regine Berg
1987: Anne Carrette
1988: Sonja Van Renterghem
1989: Anne Carrette
1990: Katrien Maenhout
1991: Katrien Maenhout
1992: Martine Meersman
1993: Katrien Maenhout
1994: Katrien Maenhout
1995: Katrien Maenhout
1996: Bieke Masselis
1997: 
1998: Katrien Maenhout
1999: Sandra Stals
2000: Sandra Stals
2001: Sandra Stals
2002: Sandra Stals
2003: Marleen Baggerman
2004: Sandra Stals
2005: Sandra Stals
2006: Kristine Strackx

800 metres
1960: Marie-Louise Wirix
1961: Marie-Louise Wirix
1962: Marie-Louise Wirix
1963: Godelieve Roggeman
1964: Anne-Marie Deffernez
1965: Anne-Marie Deffernez
1966: Marie-Claire Clerbout
1967: Marie-Claire Decroix
1968: Francine Peyskens
1969: Francine Peyskens
1970: Francine Peyskens
1971: Francine Peyskens
1972: Marleen Verheuen
1973: Anne-Marie Van Nuffel
1974: Anne-Marie Van Nuffel
1975: Rita Thijs
1976: Bernadette Van Roy
1977: Bernadette Van Roy
1978: Anne-Marie Van Nuffel
1979: Anne-Marie Van Nuffel & Betty Van Steenbroek
1980: Betty Van Steenbroek
1981: Viviane Depre
1982: Anne-Marie Van Nuffel
1983: Rosine Wallez
1984: Isabelle De Bruycker
1985: Isabelle De Bruycker
1986: Isabelle De Bruycker
1987: Regine Berg
1988: Regine Berg
1989: Anneke Matthys
1990: Anneke Matthys
1991: Sonja Van Renterghem
1992: Anneke Matthys
1993: Anneke Matthys
1994: Anneke Matthys
1995: Sandra Stals
1996: Anneke Matthys
1997: Anneke Matthys
1998: Sandra Stals
1999: Sigrid Vanden Bempt
2000: Ludivine Michel
2001: Mieke Geens
2002: Mieke Geens
2003: Sandra Stals
2004: Shanna Major
2005: Shanna Major
2006: Lieselot Matthys

1500 metres
1969: Marie-Claire Decroix
1970: Lutgarde Van Brempt
1971: Joske Van Santberghe
1972: Bernadette Van Roy
1973: Sonja Castelein
1974: Sonja Castelein
1975: Sonja Castelein
1976: Bernadette Van Roy
1977: Gertrude Meersseman
1978: Anne-Marie Van Nuffel
1979: Anne-Marie Van Nuffel
1980: Anne-Marie Van Nuffel
1981: Betty Van Steenbroek
1982: Betty Van Steenbroek
1983: Betty Van Steenbroek
1984: Betty Van Steenbroek
1985: Corinne Debaets
1986: Corinne Debaets
1987: Corinne Debaets
1988: Corinne Debaets
1989: Tania Merchiers
1990: Rita Thijs
1991: Anja Smolders
1992: Anja Smolders
1993: Anja Smolders
1994: Anja Smolders
1995: Tania Merchiers
1996: Anja Smolders
1997: Anja Smolders
1998: Anja Smolders
1999: Anja Smolders
2000: Veerle Dejaeghere
2001: Veerle Dejaeghere
2002: Veerle Dejaeghere
2003: Veerle Dejaeghere
2004: Veerle Dejaeghere
2005: Veerle Dejaeghere
2006: Veerle Dejaeghere

3000 metres
1973: Marleen Mols
1974: Sonja Castelein
1975: Sonja Castelein
1976: Marleen Mols
1977: Sonja Castelein
1978: Daniele Justin
1979: Leen Van Brempt
1980: Mimi Steels
1981: Christel Jennis
1982: Corinne Debaets
1983: Francine Peeters
1984: Corinne Debaets
1985: Betty Van Steenbroek
1986: Ria Van Landeghem
1987: Marleen Renders
1988: Corinne Debaets
1989: Tania Merchiers
1990: Corinne Debaets
1991: Ingrid Delagrange
1992: Maria Van Gestel
1993: Anja Smolders
1994: Anne-Marie Danneels

5000 metres
1995: Marleen Renders
1996: Marleen Renders
1997: Anne-Marie Danneels
1998: Anne-Marie Danneels
1999: Fatiha Baouf
2000: Anja Smolders
2001: 
2002: Mounia Aboulahcen
2003: Sigrid Vanden Bempt
2004: Fatiha Baouf
2005: Nathalie De Vos
2006: Anja Smolders

10,000 metres
1984: Ria Van Landeghem
1985: Magda Ilands
1986: Magda Ilands
1987: Magda Ilands
1988: Marleen Renders
1989: Véronique Collard
1990: Maria Van Gestel
1991: Maria Van Gestel
1992: Véronique Collard
1993: Véronique Collard
1994: Marleen Renders
1995: Anne-Marie Danneels
1996: Isabelle Collier
1997: Marleen Renders
1998: Marleen Renders
1999: Marleen Renders
2000: Marleen Renders
2001: Mounia Aboulahcen
2002: Mounia Aboulahcen
2003: Marleen Renders
2004: Mounia Aboulahcen
2005: Anja Smolders
2006: Mounia Aboulahcen

Half marathon
1992: ?
1993: Véronique Collard
1994: Marleen Renders
1995: Marleen Renders
1996: Sonja Deckers
1997: Sonja Deckers
1998: Marleen Renders
1999: Marleen Van Bael
2000: Ann Parmentier
2001: Ann Parmentier
2002: Ann Parmentier
2003: Catherine Lallemand
2004: Nathalie De Vos
2005: Nathalie Loubele

Marathon
1983: Marie-Christine Deurbroeck
1984: Marie-Christine Deurbroeck
1985: Agnes Pardaens
1986: Agnes Pardaens
1987: Nelly Aerts
1988: Magda Ilands
1989: Nelly Aerts
1990: Christel Rogiers
1991: Christel Rogiers
1992: Viviane Van Buggenhout
1993: Françoise Maton
1994: Françoise Maton
1995: Françoise Maton
1996: Virginie Van Droogenbroeck
1997: Françoise Maton
1998: Catharina Seghers
1999: Katja Merlin
2000: Katja Merlin
2001: Katja Merlin
2002: Mounia Aboulahcen
2003: Marijke Guillemyn
2004: Mounia Aboulahcen
2005: Veerle D'Haese

3000 metres steeplechase
2001: Sigrid Vanden Bempt
2002: Sigrid Vanden Bempt
2003: Sigrid Vanden Bempt
2004: Stephanie De Croock
2005: Sigrid Vanden Bempt
2006: Veerle Dejaeghere

80 metres hurdles
1960: Hilde De Cort
1961: Gerarda Lambrechts
1962: Gerarda Lambrechts
1963: Hilde De Cort
1964: Hilde De Cort
1965: Roswitha Emonts-Gast
1966: Roswitha Emonts-Gast
1967: ?
1968: ?

100 metres hurdles
1969: Anne Van Rensbergen
1970: Roswitha Emonts-Gast
1971: Anne Van Rensbergen
1972: Roswitha Emonts-Gast
1973: Carine De Bode
1974: Anne Van Rensbergen
1975: Anne-Marie Pira
1976: Anne-Marie Pira
1977: Anne-Marie Pira
1978: Lea Alaerts
1979: Anne-Marie Pira
1980: Anne-Marie Pira
1981: Myriam Wery
1982: Christa Vandercruyssen
1983: Sylvia Dethier
1984: Christa Vandercruyssen
1985: Sylvia Dethier
1986: Sylvia Dethier
1987: Sylvia Dethier
1988: Sylvia Dethier
1989: Véronique Storme
1990: Sylvia Dethier
1991: Sylvia Dethier
1992: Sylvia Dethier
1993: Caroline Delplancke
1994: Sylvia Dethier
1995: Nadine Grouwels
1996: Ann Mercken
1997: Myriam Tschomba
1998: Myriam Tschomba
1999: Myriam Tschomba
2000: Nadine Grouwels
2001: Nadine Grouwels
2002: Élodie Ouédraogo
2003: 
2004: Elisabeth Davin
2005: Elisabeth Davin
2006: Eline Berings

200 metres hurdles
1969: Nora Mommens
1970: Rozika Verberck
1971: ?
1972: ?
1973: ?
1974: Rozika Verberck
1975: Rozika Verberck

400 metres hurdles
1976: Rozika Verberck
1977: Lea Alaerts
1978: Lea Alaerts
1979: Christiane Van Landschoot
1980: Martine Vandeweyer
1981: Anne Michel
1982: Christa Vandercruyssen
1983: Christiane Van Landschoot
1984: Jacqueline Hautenauve
1985: Françoise Dethier
1986: Nathalie Nisen
1987: Nathalie Nisen
1988: Ann Maenhout
1989: Ann Maenhout
1990: Ann Maenhout
1991: Françoise Dethier
1992: Ann Maenhout
1993: Françoise Dethier
1994: Mélanie Moreels
1995: Ann Mercken
1996: Ann Mercken
1997: Mélanie Moreels
1998: Ann Mercken
1999: Ann Mercken
2000: Ann Mercken
2001: Ann Mercken
2002: Ann Mercken
2003: Nele Van Doninck
2004: Joke Mortier
2005: 
2006:

High jump
1960: Lieve Brys
1961: Jannine Knaepen
1962: Lieve Brys
1963: Gillaine Depauw
1964: Anita Van der Aa
1965: Rita Vanherck
1966: Rita Vanherck
1967: Rita Vanherck
1968: Rita Vanherck
1969: Helga Deprez
1970: Rita Vanherck
1971: Roswitha Emonts-Gast
1972: Hilde Van Dijck
1973: Hilde Van Dijck
1974: Christiane Van Landschoot
1975: Hilde Van Dijck
1976: Anne-Marie Pira
1977: Anne-Marie Pira
1978: Anne-Marie Pira
1979: Christine Soetewey
1980: Christine Soetewey
1981: Françoise Van Poelvoorde
1982: Christine Soetewey
1983: Christine Soetewey
1984: Christine Soetewey
1985: Christine Soetewey
1986: Christine Soetewey
1987: Christine Soetewey
1988: Natalja Jonckheere
1989: Sabine De Wachter
1990: May Verheyen
1991: Natalja Jonckheere
1992: Sabrina De Leeuw
1993: Sabrina De Leeuw
1994: Natalja Jonckheere
1995: Natalja Jonckheere
1996: Sabrina De Leeuw
1997: Sabrina De Leeuw
1998: Heidi Paesen
1999: Sabrina De Leeuw
2000: Tia Hellebaut
2001: Sabrina De Leeuw
2002: Tia Hellebaut
2003: Tia Hellebaut
2004: Sabrina De Leeuw
2005: Tia Hellebaut
2006: Sabrina De Leeuw

Pole vault
1995: Sophie Zubiolo
1996: Sophie Zubiolo
1997: Sophie Zubiolo
1998: 
1999: Iréna Dufour
2000: Liesbet Van Roie
2001: Caroline Goetghebuer
2002: Iréna Dufour
2003: Karen Pollefeyt
2004: Iréna Dufour
2005: Iréna Dufour
2006: Karen Pollefeyt

Long jump
1960: Gerarda Lambrechts
1961: Doreete Van de Broeck
1962: Doreete Van de Broeck
1963: Doreete Van de Broeck
1964: Rose-Marie De Bruycker
1965: Rose-Marie De Bruycker
1966: Monique Vanherck
1967: Monique Vanherck
1968: Roswitha Emonts-Gast
1969: Monique Vanherck
1970: Monique Vanherck
1971: Marleen Van Aerden
1972: Maritia De Voeght
1973: Rosine Wallez
1974: Maritia De Voeght
1975: Maritia De Voeght
1976: Maritia De Voeght
1977: Nadine Marloye
1978: Maritia De Voeght
1979: Rosanne Corneille
1980: Anne-Marie Pira
1981: Myriam Duchateau
1982: Brigitte Butaeye
1983: Myriam Duchateau
1984: Myriam Duchateau
1985: Hilda Vervaet
1986: Hilda Vervaet
1987: Hilda Vervaet
1988: Jacqueline Hautenauve
1989: Veerle Jennes
1990: Veerle Jennes
1991: Sandrine Hennart
1992: Hilda Vervaet
1993: Sandrine Hennart
1994: Sandrine Hennart
1995: Sandrine Hennart
1996: Sandrine Hennart
1997: Annelies De Meester
1998: Sandrine Hennart
1999: Sandrine Hennart
2000: Sandrine Hennart
2001: Sandra Swennen
2002: 
2003: Sandra Swennen
2004: Caroline Lahaye
2005: Jessica Van de Steene
2006: Tia Hellebaut

Triple jump
1991: Heidi Van Collie
1992: Jacqueline Muyls
1993: 
1994: Sandra Swennen
1995: Heidi Van Collie
1996: Sandra Swennen
1997: Sandra Swennen
1998: Sandra Swennen
1999: Sandra Swennen
2000: Sandra Swennen
2001: Sandra Swennen
2002: Sandra Swennen
2003: Sandra Swennen
2004: Jessica Van de Steene
2005: Jessica Van de Steene
2006: Jolien Van Brempt

Shot put
1960: Simone Saenen
1961: Simone Saenen
1962: Simone Saenen
1963: Hilde De Cort
1964: Hilde De Cort
1965: Simone Saenen
1966: Marcella Coremans
1967: Marcella Coremans
1968: Marcella Coremans
1969: Helga Deprez
1970: Helga Deprez
1971: Helga Deprez
1972: Genevieve Van Driessche
1973: Genevieve Van Driessche
1974: Helga Deprez
1975: Brigitte De Leeuw
1976: Brigitte De Leeuw
1977: Brigitte De Leeuw
1978: Brigitte De Leeuw
1979: Brigitte De Leeuw
1980: Brigitte De Leeuw
1981: Brigitte De Leeuw
1982: Brigitte De Leeuw
1983: Brigitte De Leeuw
1984: Brigitte De Leeuw
1985: Brigitte De Leeuw
1986: Marie-Paule Geldhof
1987: Brigitte De Leeuw
1988: Marie-Paule Geldhof
1989: Brigitte De Leeuw
1990: Brigitte De Leeuw
1991: Greet Meulemeester
1992: Greet Meulemeester
1993: Greet Meulemeester
1994: Greet Meulemeester
1995: Greet Meulemeester
1996: Greet Meulemeester
1997: Greet Meulemeester
1998: Greet Meulemeester
1999: Greet Meulemeester
2000: Veerle Blondeel
2001: Veerle Blondeel
2002: Sophie Verlinden
2003: Veerle Blondeel
2004: Veerle Blondeel
2005: Veerle Blondeel
2006: Veerle Blondeel

Discus throw
1960: Simone Saenen
1961: Simone Saenen
1962: Simone Saenen
1963: Rita Beyens
1964: Rita Beyens
1965: Simone Saenen
1966: Julia Heck
1967: Monique Goeffers
1968: Rita Beyens
1969: Maggy Wauters
1970: Maggy Wauters
1971: Maggy Wauters
1972: Maggy Wauters
1973: Maggy Wauters
1974: Maggy Wauters
1975: Maggy Wauters
1976: Maggy Wauters
1977: Maggy Wauters
1978: Maggy Wauters
1979: Rita Beyens
1980: Ingrid Engelen
1981: Marie-Paule Geldhof
1982: Marie-Paule Geldhof
1983: Marie-Paule Geldhof
1984: Ingrid Engelen
1985: Ingrid Engelen
1986: Ingrid Engelen
1987: Marie-Paule Geldhof
1988: Marie-Paule Geldhof
1989: Marie-Paule Geldhof
1990: Marie-Paule Geldhof
1991: Marie-Paule Geldhof
1992: Griet Maes
1993: Brigitte De Leeuw
1994: Marie-Paule Geldhof
1995: Veerle Blondeel
1996: Veerle Blondeel
1997: Veerle Blondeel
1998: Veerle Blondeel
1999: Veerle Blondeel
2000: Veerle Blondeel
2001: Veerle Blondeel
2002: Marie-Paule Geldhof
2003: 
2004: Veerle Blondeel
2005: Veerle Blondeel
2006: Veerle Blondeel

Hammer throw
1995: Laurence Reckelbus
1996: Laurence Reckelbus
1997: Jennifer Petit
1998: Jennifer Petit
1999: Jennifer Petit
2000: Hannelore Poissonnier
2001: Sarah Luyimi Mbala
2002: Sarah Luyimi Mbala
2003: 
2004: Patricia Blondeel
2005: Irina Sustelo
2006: Irina Sustelo

Javelin throw
1960: Ghislaine D'Hollander
1961: Ghislaine D'Hollander
1962: Ghislaine D'Hollander
1963: Ghislaine D'Hollander
1964: Ghislaine D'Hollander
1965: Ghislaine D'Hollander
1966: Ghislaine D'Hollander
1967: Ghislaine D'Hollander
1968: Ghislaine D'Hollander
1969: Ghislaine D'Hollander
1970: Leen Wuyts
1971: Leen Wuyts
1972: Leen Wuyts
1973: Leen Wuyts
1974: Leen Wuyts
1975: Françoise Lheureux
1976: Françoise Lheureux
1977: Leen Wuyts
1978: Gaby Lebeau
1979: Gaby Lebeau
1980: Nicole Broeckx
1981: Gaby Lebeau
1982: Martine Florent
1983: Martine Florent
1984: Gaby Lebeau
1985: Martine Florent
1986: Martine Florent
1987: Martine Florent
1988: Martine Florent
1989: Martine Florent
1990: Martine Florent
1991: Ingrid Didden
1992: Isabelle Vermeiren
1993: Ingrid Didden
1994: Ingrid Didden
1995: Leen Wuyts
1996: Cindy Stas
1997: Cindy Stas
1998: 
1999: Cindy Stas
2000: Cindy Stas
2001: Heidi Marien
2002: Cindy Stas
2003: Cindy Stas
2004: Cindy Stas
2005: Cindy Stas
2006: Sofie Schoenmaekers

Pentathlon
1960: Jannine Knaepen
1961: Jannine Knaepen
1962: Therese Schueremans
1963: Roswitha Emonts-Gast
1964: Roswitha Emonts-Gast
1965: Hilde De Cort
1966: Rita Vanherck
1967: Roswitha Emonts-Gast
1968: Rita Vanherck
1969: Rita Vanherck
1970: Roswitha Emonts-Gast
1971: Roswitha Emonts-Gast
1972: Roswitha Emonts-Gast
1973: Martine Lambrecht
1974: Christiane Van Landschoot
1975: Christiane Van Landschoot
1976: Anne-Marie Pira
1977: Anne-Marie Pira
1978: Rosanne Corneille
1979: Anne-Marie Pira
1980: Marie-Christine Caron

Heptathlon
1981: Marie-Christine Caron
1982: Christiane Van Landschoot
1983: Christiane Van Landschoot
1984: Christiane Van Landschoot
1985: Marie-Christine Caron
1986: Jacqueline Hautenauve
1987: Jacqueline Hautenauve
1988: Jacqueline Hautenauve
1989: Ervjin Hilde
1990: Ingrid Didden
1991: Ingrid Didden
1992: Mélanie Moreels
1993: Ingrid Didden
1994: Annelies De Meester
1995: Sabine De Wachter
1996: Annelies De Meester
1997: Mélanie Moreels
1998: Annelies De Meester
1999: Tia Hellebaut
2000: Tia Hellebaut
2001: Joke Visser
2002: Tia Hellebaut
2003: Isabel Poelmans
2004: Sara Aerts
2005: Sara Aerts

5000 metres walk
The race was held as a road event in 1977, 1997, 1998 and 2002.
1977: Christel Velghe
1978: Claudine Hoogstoel
1979: Claudine Hoogstoel
1980: Claudine Hoogstoel
1981: Claudine Hoogstoel
1982: Claudine Hoogstoel
1983: Claudine Hoogstoel
1984: Claudine Hoogstoel
1985: Claudine Hoogstoel
1986: Not held
1987: Not held
1988: Not held
1989: Not held
1990: Not held
1991: Not held
1992: Christa Ceulemans
1993: ?
1994: Christa Ceulemans
1995: Frieda De Wolf
1996: Christel Schenk
1997: Christel Schenk
1998: Christel Schenk
1999: Godelieve Hoogewijs
2000: Liesbet Desmet
2001: Liesbet Desmet
2002: Liesbet Desmet
2003: Liesbet Desmet
2004: Frieda De Wolf
2005: ?

10,000 metres walk
The race was held as a road event from 1995 to 1997.
1986: Christel Schenk
1987: Sabine Desmet
1988: Christa Ceulemans
1989: Christa Ceulemans
1990: ?
1991: Christa Ceulemans
1992: ?
1993: ?
1994: ?
1995: Christel Schenk
1996: Christel Schenk
1997: Christel Schenk

20 kilometres walk
2004: Frieda De Wolf

Cross country (long course)
1970: Marie-Claire Decroix
1971: Joske Van Santberghe
1972: Joske Van Santberghe
1973: Joske Van Santberghe
1974: Joske Van Santberghe
1975: Magda Ilands
1976: Viviane Van Emelen
1977: Marleen Mols
1978: Marleen Mols
1979: Francine Peeters
1980: Magda Ilands
1981: Marie-Christine Deurbroeck
1982: Magda Ilands
1983: Francine Peeters
1984: Francine Peeters
1985: Betty Van Steenbroek
1986: Corinne Debaets
1987: Véronique Collard
1988: Véronique Collard
1989: Véronique Collard
1990: Véronique Collard
1991: Lieve Slegers
1992: Lieve Slegers
1993: Véronique Collard
1994: Lieve Slegers
1995: Lieve Slegers
1996: Anne-Marie Danneels
1997: Anja Smolders
1998: Anja Smolders
1999: Anja Smolders
2000: Anja Smolders
2001: Anja Smolders
2002: Anja Smolders
2003: Fatiha Baouf
2004: Anja Smolders
2005: Mounia Aboulahcen
2006: Nathalie De Vos

Cross country (short course)
1992: Linda Berghman
1993: Laurence Roobaert
1994: Maria Byczkowska
1995: Els Van Collie
1996: Els Van Collie
1997: Els Verthé
1998: Els Van Collie
1999: Els Van Collie
2000: Véronique Collard
2001: Véronique Collard
2002: Véronique Collard
2003: Veerle Dejaeghere
2004: Mieke Geens
2005: Liesbeth Van de Velde
2006: Sylvie Verthé

References

Champions 1960–2006
Belgian Championships. GBR Athletics. Retrieved 2021-02-06.

Winners
 List
Belgian Championships
Athletics